For the 1947 Vuelta a España, the field consisted of 47 riders; 27 finished the race.

References

1947 Vuelta a España
1947